The Magnificent Two is a 1967 British comedy film directed by Cliff Owen and starring Morecambe and Wise in the third and final of their 1960s trio of films.

Plot 
Two British Action Man travelling salesmen are sent to the South American country of Parazuellia to sell their goods. During the train journey, Eric accidentally opens a door leading to the death of the returning British educated Torres who is the figurehead of a revolutionary movement and a government secret policeman arresting him. Upon arrival in the city of Campo Grande, Eric is mistaken by the revolutionaries for Torres, and though they discover the death of the real Torres they pay Eric and Ernie to maintain Eric's impersonation of Torres to lead a revolution to oust a brutal dictator. However, once the revolution is successful Eric gains an inflated opinion of himself.

Cast
 Eric Morecambe as Eric
 Ernie Wise as Ernie
 Margit Saad as Carla
 Virgilio Teixeira as Carillo
 Cecil Parker as British ambassador
 Isobel Black as Juanita
 Martin Benson as President Diaz
 Tyler Butterworth as Miguel - President's Younger Son
 Sandor Elès as Armandez
 Victor Maddern as Drunken soldier
 Michael Gover as Doctor

Production
The film was shot at Black Park, the Longmoor Military Railway and Pinewood Studios. The film was also known as What Happened at Campo Grande?

Reception
Time Out wrote, "in which the comedians' special talents are woefully misused. At least Cliff Owen keeps it pacy, making it the least awful of the trio of movies in which the duo failed to take the cinema by storm"; and TV Guide described it as a "fair comedy."

It was one of the twelve most popular films at the British box office in 1967.

References

1967 films
1967 comedy films
British comedy films
Films shot at Pinewood Studios
Films directed by Cliff Owen
Morecambe and Wise
Films scored by Ron Goodwin
Films set in South America
1960s English-language films
1960s British films